Or Ostvind (born 18 December 1987) is an Israeli footballer who currently plays for Hapoel Nir Ramat HaSharon.

External links

1987 births
Living people
Israeli Jews
Israeli footballers
Israel international footballers
Hapoel Nir Ramat HaSharon F.C. players
Beitar Tel Aviv Bat Yam F.C. players
Hapoel Haifa F.C. players
Hapoel Ironi Kiryat Shmona F.C. players
Hapoel Tel Aviv F.C. players
Hapoel Ramat Gan F.C. players
Liga Leumit players
Israeli Premier League players
Footballers from Ramat HaSharon
Association football midfielders